The Archdeacon of Cornwall is a senior cleric in the Church of England Diocese of Truro.

History and composition
The archdeaconry of Cornwall was created in the Diocese of Exeter in the late 11th century. The area and the archdeacon remained part of that diocese until 15 December 1876 when the Diocese of Truro was established. The archdeaconry was then divided on 21 May 1878 to create the new Archdeaconry of Bodmin.

Today, the archdeaconry of Cornwall consists of the deaneries of Carnmarth North, Carnmarth South, Kerrier, Penwith, Powder, Pydar and St Austell (Powder deanery includes the Isles of Scilly).

List of archdeacons

High Medieval
?–1086–?: Roland
?–13 June 1098 (d.): Alnothus
bef. 1110–aft. 1110: Ernaldus
bef. –aft. : Hugo de Auco
bef. –aft. : William
bef. –aft. : A.
aft. –30 April 1157 (d.): Walter
aft. 1161–bef. 1171: Ralph Luce
?–7 September 1171 (d.): Peter
bef. –aft. : Galterus
bef. 1191–aft. 1186: Walter Fitz Rogo
bef. –aft. : Simon (nephew of the bishop, Simon of Apulia)
bef. 28 May 1228–aft. 1228: Martin
bef. 1238–aft. 1238: Thomas
bef. August 1243–aft. August 1243: John Rof
Jordan
bef. 1264–1264 (res.): Geofrey de Bismano
7 April 1264–bef. 1274: Robert de Tefford
23 August 1274 – 28 June 1282 (d.): John de Esse
8 July 1282–bef. 1296: Henry (or Thomas) de Bolleghe
1295–1307 (d.): William Bodrugan

Late Medieval
7 January 1308 – 30 June 1342 (exch.): Adam de Carleton
: Walter (disputed)
8 March 1328: Nicholas de Scotton (mistaken royal grant)
30 June 1342 – 24 March 1344 (exch. reversed): Annibale Cardinal di Ceccano (Cardinal-bishop of Frascati)
24 March 1344 – 19 June 1346 (exch.): Adam de Carleton (again)
19 June 1346 – 1349 (res.): John de St Paul, later  Archbishop of Dublin
1349–1371: The king and the pope appointed a succession of opposing claimants:
Papal grants:
1349–bef. 1355 (res.): John de Harewell
7 February 1355–bef. 1361 (d.): Thomas David
16 August 1361–bef. 1371: Alexander Neville,  later Archbishop of York
Royal grants:
15 February 1350 – 16 November 1357 (exch.): William Cusance
16 November 1357–bef. 1371: Nicholas de Newton
15 October 1371 – 17 March 1377 (exch.): Thomas de Orgrave
17 March 1377 – 26 July 1381 (exch.): Robert Braybrooke,  later Bishop of London
26 July 1381–bef. 1397 (res.): Nicholas Braybrooke
: Richard Lentwardyn (ineffective exchange)
14 July 1397 – 1412 (res.): Edward Dantsey, later Bishop of  Meath
3 April 1413–bef. 1418 (d.): John Bremore
15 September 1418–bef. 1419 (d.): Richard Penels
29 May 1419 – 1436 (res.): William Fylham
2 October 1436–bef. 1445 (d.): Walter Trengof
20 February 1445–bef. 1446 (d.): Richard Helyer
19 December 1446–bef. 1449 (res.): Henry Trevilian
20 March 1449 – 12 February 1461 (exch.): John Selot
12 February 1461–aft. 1463: Thomas Marke
bef. 1491–1499 (res.): William Sylke
15 April 1499 – 1509 (res.): Thomas Harrys

16 December 1509 – 1515 (res.): Bernard Oldham
18 April–September 1515 (res.): John Fulford
28 September 1515–bef 1517 (res.): Hugh Ashton
3 February 1517–bef. 1528 (res.): Richard Sampson, later Bishop of Coventry and Lichfield
8 September 1528 – 1534 (res.): Rowland Lee, later Bishop of Coventry and Lichfield
11 June 1534–September 1537 (d.): Thomas Bedyll
8 October 1537–bef. 1543 (res.): Thomas Wynter (also Archdeacon of York until 1540)

Early modern
25 May 1543 – 1545 (res.): John Pollard (also Archdeacon of Wilts until 1544 and Archdeacon of Barnstaple from 1544)
17 October 1547–bef. 1553 (res.): Hugh Weston
23 September 1554–bef. 1556: John Rixman
2 March 1556 – 1563 (d.): George Harvey
13 October 1563 – 1563 (deprived): Roger Alley (son of the bishop, William Alley)
3 January 1571 – 1603 (d.): Thomas Somaster 2nd son of William Somaster (1507–1589) of Painsford, Ashprington
10 June 1574–?: Nicholas Marston (presumably ineffective)
5 September 1603–bef. 1616 (res.): William Hutchinson
21 July–October 1616 (res.): Jasper Swift
8 November 1616–bef. 1629 (res.): William Parker
27 January 1629–bef. 1631: Martin Mansogg/Nansogg
bef. 1631–1631 (d.): William Parker (again)
22 July 1631 – 27 July 1633 (d.): Robert Peterson
30 July 1633–bef. 1641 (res.): Robert Hall
7 October 1641 – 1641: George Hall
1641–1660: Vacant during the English Commonwealth
1 August 1660–bef. 1672: Edward Cotton
3 September 1672 – 17 December 1714 (d.): Edward Drew
25 January 1715 – 1717: Lancelot Blackburne (also Dean of Exeter)
1717–1732: ?
7 February 1732 – 27 July 1737 (d.): Charles Fleetwood
14 September 1737–bef. 1741 (d.): George Allanson
25 August 1741 – 1 February 1788 (d.): John Sleech
15 February 1788 – 12 March 1807 (d.): George Moore
8 April 1807 – 1826 (res.): William Short
6 February 1826 – 1826 (res.): John Bull
11 May 1826 – 17 December 1844 (d.): John Sheepshanks
6 January 1845–aft. 1885: William Phillpotts

Late modern
The archdeaconry was transferred to the new Truro diocese on 15 December 1876.
1888–1916 (res.): John Cornish (also Bishop of St Germans from 1905)
1916–15 August 1925 (d.): Stamford Raffles-Flint
1925–1946 (d.): Guy Hockley
1947–14 August 1949 (d.): John Holden, Assistant Bishop
1949–1965 (ret.): Frederick Boreham
1965–1981 (ret.): Peter Young (afterwards archdeacon emeritus)
1981–1988 (ret.): Arnold Wood (afterwards archdeacon emeritus)
1988–1996 (ret.): Raymond Ravenscroft
1996–1999 (ret.): Trevor McCabe (afterwards archdeacon emeritus)
2000–2005 (ret.): Rodney Whiteman (afterwards archdeacon emeritus)
1 February 2006 – 22 September 2012 (res.): Roger Bush (afterwards Dean of Truro, 2012)
16 December 201215 May 2018: Bill Stuart-White
15 May 20181 September 2019 (Acting): Audrey Elkington, Archdeacon of Bodmin
1 September 2019 – present: Paul Bryer

References

Sources

 

Lists of Anglicans
 
Archdeacon of Cornwall